During the 1992–93 English football season, Sheffield Wednesday competed in the inaugural season of the FA Premier League.

Season summary
Sheffield Wednesday enjoyed a great season, finishing seventh in the inaugural Premier League season having a joint highest winning run of 7 alongside Manchester United and reaching the finals of both domestic cups, only to be defeated in both by Arsenal. The only negative from an otherwise good season occurred in Europe, with the club being knocked out of the UEFA Cup in the second round.

Final league table

Results
Sheffield Wednesday's score comes first

Legend

FA Premier League

FA Cup

League Cup

UEFA Cup

Players

First-team squad
Squad at end of season

Statistics

Starting 11
Not considering starts in UEFA Cup
 GK:  Chris Woods, 42
 RB:  Roland Nilsson, 35
 CB:  Carlton Palmer, 36
 CB:  Viv Anderson, 26
 LB:  Nigel Worthington, 42
 RM:  John Harkes, 26
 CM:  John Sheridan, 28
 LM:  Chris Waddle, 35
 CF:  Paul Warhurst, 28
 CF:  Mark Bright, 31
 CF:  David Hirst, 24

References

Notes

Sheffield Wednesday F.C. seasons
Sheffield Wednesday